Saints Thalassius and Limneus (5th century) were Syrian hermits.
Their feast day is 22 February.

Monks of Ramsgate account

The monks of St Augustine's Abbey, Ramsgate wrote in their Book of Saints (1921),

Butler's account

The hagiographer Alban Butler (1710–1773) wrote in his Lives of the Fathers, Martyrs, and Other Principal Saints under February 22,

Baring-Gould's account

Sabine Baring-Gould (1834–1924) in his Lives Of The Saints wrote under February 22,

Notes

Sources

 
 
 

Syrian Christian saints
5th-century deaths
Byzantine hermits
5th-century Byzantine monks
5th-century Christian saints
5th-century Syrian people